Zăpodia may refer to several villages in Romania:

 Zăpodia, a village in Colonești Commune, Bacău County
 Zăpodia, a village in Traian Commune, Bacău County
 Zăpodia, a village in Cozieni Commune, Buzău County
 Zapodia, the Hungarian name for Zăpodea village, Sânger Commune, Mureș County